The Bank of Alwaye was an Indian private sector bank that served the Municipality of Alwaye. It was founded in 1942 by industrialist M. K. Mackar Pillay. The bank was later amalgamated with the State Bank of Travancore in 1964.

References 

Defunct banks of India
Banks based in Kerala
Banks established in 1942
Banks disestablished in 1965
Indian companies established in 1942
Indian companies disestablished in 1965